Sclafani is an Italian surname of noble origins.

Coat of arms 

The Sclafani coat of arms is divided in half and bears two cranes facing one another, inversely colored in Argent (silver) to signify peace, and Sable (black) to represent jewels, specifically diamond. An eagle is displayed with a Count's crown of Or (gold) signifying the family's noble heritage.

Crane - Longevity, loyalty, vigilance.

Eagle - One of noble nature, strength, bravery, and alertness; one who is high-spirited, ingenious, quick-witted, judicious, true magnanimity and strength of mind. Wings displayed signifies protection.

History 

The surname "Sclafani" is derived from the Greek "Aesculapii fanum," meaning "Sacred to the god Aesculapius," the Roman god of medicine, implying the Sclafani family has been gifted in the field of medicine and healing since the name's origin. Further, ancient thermal healing baths were created and still stand today in a city founded by the family, Sclafani Bagni. The Greek version of the surname Sclafani, "Sclavounos", can be located in the "Dictionnaire Historique et Généalogique des Grandes Familles de Grèce", a book which contains information about Greek nobility. The exact surname "Sclafani" can be found in the "Dizionario Storico Blasonico", an armorial of noble Italian family lineages.

Giovanni Sclifano was given a castle, Castello Megerio, and its territory by King William I of Sicily to show his gratitude for having Giovanni's support in the conspiracy of Matthew Bonello. A son of Giovanni, Goffredo Sclifano, founded a monastery in Lentini around the year 1185. 

Matteo Sclafani, a powerful baron of the time who became the first Count of Adernò in 1303, during the rule of the Aragonese rule, and later also Count and Lord of Sclafani in 1330. Aside from being involved with the Knights Templar, he built many palaces and cathedrals throughout Italy including a magnificent royal palace in Palermo, Palazzo Sclafani (which later became an important hospital, today the Trinità military barracks), the Monastery of Santa Chiara in 1341, the church of Sant'Agostino, and of San Niccolò dell'Albergaria. He died in the year 1354, in Castle Pietrarossa, Caltanissetta. A second Matteo Scalafani was Count of Adernò and Lord of Cimina. His son, Antonino, helped free Blanche I of Navarre from the grip of Count Bernardo Cabrera, by secreting her into a boat of the harbor.

Due to lack of male heirs, some of the family's fortune of that time was passed to the Moncada family.

Cities 

Cities bearing the name Sclafani:

Sclafani Bagni 
Official Site  
Elevation: 811 meters
Land Area: 135,06 km2
Economy: agriculture, thermal station
Population: 506
Population name: Sclafanese

Chiusa Sclafani 
Official Site  
Elevation: 614 meters
Land Area: 58 km2
Economy: agriculture, stock-breeding, timber
Population: 3.302
Population name: Chiusino

Cities with a large population of Sclafani:

Sciacca 
Official Site  
Elevation: 60 meters
Land Area: 191,0 km2
Economy: agriculture, fishing, summer tourism, shipbuilding
Population: 40.240
Population name: Saccense

Palermo 
Official Site  
Elevation: 29 meters
Land Area: 158,88 km2
Economy: agriculture (citrus fruit, vegetables), industries, handicraft, commerce and trade, tourism, services
Population: 686.722
Population name: Palermitano

See also 
 Palazzo Sclafani
 Sclafani Bagni
 Chiusa Sclafani

References

External links
 Region of Sicily - Sicilian Nobility (Italian)
 Distribution of Sclafani Families in Italy
 Distribution of Sclafani Families in the US in 1920
 Distribution of Sclafani Families in France
 Lists - Matteo Moncada and Giovanni Moncada both as counts of Sclafani, could be a reference to Matteo Sclafani and Giovanni Sclafani. 15th–17th centuries, a powerful family from Paternò, Sicily
 Anna Sclafani - the 7th Sister and the Pleiades (forum)

Italian-language surnames